The Okotoks Dawgs are a collegiate summer baseball team based in Okotoks, Alberta, Canada.  They play in the Western Canadian Baseball League (WCBL).  The Dawgs are six-time WCBL champions.

History
The Dawgs were originally based in Calgary where they were known as the Calgary Dawgs. The roots of the team date to 1996 (as shown in the team's logo) "with the formation of an elite youth travel team". The Dawgs joined the WCBL in 2003, playing at Foothills Stadium.  They won the 2004 league championship in front of over 3,400 fans. The arrival of the professional Calgary Vipers in 2005 led to numerous bitter conflicts between the two clubs over use of the stadium, and ultimately forced the Dawgs to suspend operations for the 2006 season.

The franchise resumed operations in 2007 in the town of Okotoks, 18 kilometres south of Calgary, after brothers Don and Doc Seaman funded the construction of Seaman Stadium at the cost of $8 million. The team has been a huge success in Okotoks. Their average of 1,825 fans per game in 2008 was the most of any baseball team in Alberta and made them the top drawing collegiate team in Canada. Attendance steadily increased to an estimated 2,400 per game by 2011, which team director John Ircandia attributed to the community's enthusiastic support, noting that games "kind of became a place to see your neighbours again."  In 2019, the team attracted an average of 3,937 fans per game, the third-highest in all of Summer Collegiate baseball. 

The organization operates several high performance teams at the under-18 and under-15 levels. Since their arrival in Okotoks, the community has seen a significant increase in participation in minor baseball, growing from 150 registered players in 2006 to over 500 in 2011.

The Dawgs have been equally successful on the field since their move to Okotoks, capturing the 2007, 2008 and 2009 championships.  One former Dawg, pitcher Jim Henderson, has gone on to play Major League Baseball. He made his debut with the Milwaukee Brewers in 2012, nine years after he played for the Dawgs. He went on to become the Brewers closer in 2013, collecting 28 saves. Former Dawgs catcher Jordan Procyshen was drafted by the Boston Red Sox in 2014, and spent much of the 2016 through 2018 seasons with the Class A-Advanced Salem Red Sox.

See also
List of baseball teams in Canada

References

Further reading
Hall of Fame

External links
Official web site

Baseball teams in Alberta
Baseball teams in Calgary
Baseball teams established in 2003
Okotoks
2003 establishments in Alberta